Hyborian Gates is an out-of-print collectible card game by Cardz. It was first released in July 1995. It featured art from Boris Vallejo and Julie Bell but suffered from bad cropping. A total of 450 cards were released in the core set and an additional 10 promo cards were also released. Starter decks contained 110 cards and booster packs had 12 cards. An expansion called Gatemasters was scheduled for a 1996 release but never materialized.

Reception
According to Allen Varney of The Duelist the game was said to be "utterly dull".

References

External links
Overview in Scrye #8

Card games introduced in 1995
Collectible card games